2007–08 Belarusian Cup was the 17th edition of the football knock-out competition in Belarus.

First round
12 teams from the First League (out of 14, excluding Belshina Bobruisk and Lokomotiv Minsk who relegated from the Premier League after 2006 season), 13 teams from the Second League (out of 16, excluding three teams which were reverve squads for Premier and First League teams) and 7 amateur clubs started in this round. The games were played on 28 and 30 July 2007.

Round of 32
16 winners of previous round were joined by 14 clubs from Premier League and two First League clubs which relegated from the Premier League after 2006 season. The games were played in August and September 2007.

Round of 16
The first legs were played on 15 and 16 March 2008. The second legs were played on 21 and 22 March 2008.

|}
1 Kommunalnik Zhlobin withdrew from the Cup due to bankruptcy.

First leg

Second leg

Quarterfinals
The first legs were played on 29 March 2008. The second legs were played on 2 April 2008.

|}

First leg

Second leg

Semifinals
The first legs were played on 16 April 2008. The second legs were played on 30 April 2008.

|}

First leg

Second leg

Final

External links
RSSSF

Belarusian Cup seasons
Belarus
Cup, 2007-08
Cup, 2007-08